Tomasz Majewski (born 30 August 1981) is a Polish shot putter and a double Olympic  gold medalist. He is the third shot putter to successfully defend the Olympic title, first European to do so, and the first since Parry O'Brien in 1956.

Career
Majewski stands at 204 cm (6' 8") tall and weighs 140 kg (300 lb).

During the Olympic final in Beijing on 15 August 2008, he threw 21.51 meters for the gold medal, Poland's first Olympic medal in shot put since 1972 when the late Władysław Komar took the gold. Majewski was also the first Pole to win gold at the 2008 Olympics.

On 25 July 2009 in Barcelona he threw a personal best of 21.64 m and few days later in DN Galan in Stockholm, Sweden he improved upon this with a throw of 21.95 m, a new Polish record.

At the 2010 IAAF World Indoor Championships he threw a personal best and Polish indoor record of 21.20 m. However, the level of competition was so high that this was only enough for fifth place behind a Canadian record-breaking Dylan Armstrong. It was the first time in championships history that five men had gone beyond the 21 m mark.

In the outdoor season, Majewski competed at the 2010 European Athletics Championships and won the shot put silver medal. His 21-metre throw was beaten by a single centimetre as Andrei Mikhnevich took the title. He had shoulder surgery in the latter half of the year. Focusing on the 2011 season, he said that the strong form of his opponents was more of an inspiration than an obstacle: "Christian Cantwell and Reese Hoffa [both] went over 22 metres last year, the good performances of my rivals doesn't make me angry or worried, instead it acts as the best sort of motivation to get up to their level".

At the 2011 European Team Championships he was the silver medallist behind David Storl and while his young German rival went on to win at the 2011 World Championships in Athletics, Majewski managed only ninth place with a best throw of 20.18 m. At the start of 2012 he broke his own Polish indoor record at the BW-Bank Meeting in Karlsruhe with a winning mark of 21.27 m. In London 2012 he won the gold medal with a mark of 21.89 m and he became the first male shot-put thrower to defend his Olympic title since Parry O'Brien achieved that in Melbourne 1956.

Hobbies
His hobbies include basketball and playing video games.

National honours
For his sport achievements, he received:
 Knight's Cross of the Order of Polonia Restituta (5th Class) in 2008.
 Officer's Cross of the Order of Polonia Restituta (4th Class) in 2009.

Personal bests
Outdoor – 21.95 m (2009)
Indoor – 21.72 m (2012)

His best attempt was in Sweden DN Galan (21.65 m, 21.95 m, 21.44 m, x, x, 21.83 m).

Achievements

References

External links

Poland's Majewski ready to bask in the Barcelona Sun
Tomasz Majewski gold medal at London 2012 Olympics, on official Olympic channel

1981 births
Living people
People from Nasielsk
Sportspeople from Masovian Voivodeship
Polish male shot putters
Olympic athletes of Poland
Olympic gold medalists for Poland
Athletes (track and field) at the 2004 Summer Olympics
Athletes (track and field) at the 2008 Summer Olympics
Athletes (track and field) at the 2012 Summer Olympics
Athletes (track and field) at the 2016 Summer Olympics
Medalists at the 2008 Summer Olympics
Medalists at the 2012 Summer Olympics
World Athletics Championships athletes for Poland
World Athletics Championships medalists
European Athletics Championships medalists
Olympic gold medalists in athletics (track and field)
Universiade medalists in athletics (track and field)
Skra Warszawa athletes
Universiade gold medalists for Poland
Medalists at the 2005 Summer Universiade
21st-century Polish people